Euchilichthys dybowskii is a species of upside-down catfish native to Cameroon, Central African Republic and the Democratic Republic of the Congo where it is found in the Dja and Ubangi Rivers and rivers of the eastern Congo Basin.  This species grows to a length of  TL.

References
 
 

Mochokidae
Catfish of Africa
Freshwater fish of Cameroon
Fish of the Central African Republic
Fish of the Democratic Republic of the Congo
Fish described in 1892